Margaret of York (1446-1503) was the duchess of Burgundy from 1468 until 1477.

Three more women named Margaret were duchesses of Burgundy:
Margaret III of Flanders (1350-1405), married to Philip of Rouvres, and later to Philip the Bold
Margaret of Bavaria (1363-1424), wife of John the Fearless
Margaret of Austria, Queen of Spain (1584–1611)